Grenoble – Le Versoud Aerodrome  is an airport located 10 km northeast of Grenoble, in Le Versoud, a commune of the Isère department in the Rhône-Alpes region of France.

The airport had 69,058  aircraft movements in 2009 and 72,493 in 2011.

References

External links
 Aérodrome de Grenoble - Le Versoud  

Airports in Auvergne-Rhône-Alpes
Transport in Grenoble
Buildings and structures in Isère